Iryna Papezhuk (born ) is a Ukrainian female  track cyclist. She competed in the sprint and team sprint event at the 2012 UCI Track Cycling World Championships.

References

External links
 Profile at cyclingarchives.com

1986 births
Living people
Ukrainian track cyclists
Ukrainian female cyclists
Place of birth missing (living people)
21st-century Ukrainian women